A backboard is a piece of basketball equipment. It is a raised vertical board with an attached basket consisting of a net suspended from a hoop. It is made of a flat, rigid piece of, often Plexiglas or tempered glass which also has the properties of safety glass when accidentally shattered. It is usually rectangular as used in NBA, NCAA and international basketball. In recreational environments, a backboard may be oval or a fan-shape, particularly in non-professional games.

In addition to those markings and those of its manufacturer, leagues and governing bodies often place other decals on the edge of the backboard on the glass, including the logo of the league or organization, and a national flag. On top of the backboard, a league or team's web address or sponsor logo is affixed to take advantage of the high television camera angle utilized for instant replay of slam dunks and other shots above the rim.

In professional and most higher college settings, the backboard is part of a portable wheeled stanchion that can be moved out of the way and stored to allow the venue to host multiple other sports and events, though in most high schools and examples such as Stanford University's Maples Pavilion and Cameron Indoor Stadium at Duke University, backboards are mounted as part of a suspended system using the venue's ceiling joists to support the goal and allow them to be put out of the way in the ceiling support system via a system of pulleys when not in use, along with the more common wall-mounted system. Practice or gym class-utilized sideline backboards are generally of the permanently wall-mounted variety, and usually have opaque fiberglass or thick metal boards instead, along with most outdoor municipal park boards.

In intervening years, the portable stanchion containing the backboard has also taken on cabling and sensors within its core, along with the structure of a game clock and shot clock above it, which makes the setup of one as involved as an arena's basketball floor, to the point of requiring a replacement backboard being on standby if it and/or the rim is ever taken out of level or broken.

The first glass backboard was used by the Indiana Hoosiers men's basketball team at the Men's Gymnasium at Indiana University. After the first few games at their new facility in 1917, spectators complained that they could not see the game because of opaque wooden backboards. As a result, the Nurre Mirror Plate Company in Bloomington was employed to create new backboards that contained  plate glass so that fans could see games without an obstructed view. It was the first facility in the country to use glass backboards.

Modern professional and higher-level college play backboards do not have the glass absorbing any weight to avoid breaking the glass and backboard as a whole.

References

Basketball backboards range in size from 44 inches to 54 inches and are constructed from a variety of materials to provide rebound performance and durability.

Backboards for basketball are flat, raised, vertical boards with mounted baskets or rims that are used to assist or return the ball after a shot in a basketball game. Backboards, which are typically constructed of tempered glass or Plexiglas, are intended to withstand player dunks without shattering.

For relaxed non-guideline courts, more modest Fan-Molded Backboards are frequently utilized.

Basketball equipment